Robert William Goddard (born 13 November 1954 in Fareham, Hampshire) is an English novelist.

Life and career
Goddard was educated at Bathampton County Primary School then Wallisdean County Junior School and Price's Grammar School in Fareham before going on to study history at Peterhouse at the University of Cambridge. After unsuccessful attempts at careers in both journalism and teaching, he worked for a time as an educational administrator in Devon before becoming a full-time novelist. His thrillers usually have a historical element and settings in provincial English towns and cities, and many plot twists. They usually involve the lead character gradually uncovering a secret or conspiracy which has long been kept secret, by means of historical documents such as diaries or by means of word-of-mouth accounts that have been handed down from one person to another. Goddard's first novel, Past Caring, was published in 1986. He has since written more than twenty novels; the majority have been Sunday Times Top Ten best-sellers in the UK.

Awards
Goddard's 1990 book Into the Blue was the inaugural winner of the W H Smith Thumping Good Read Award, presented to the best new fiction author of the year.

Goddard's 1997 book Beyond Recall was nominated for the Edgar Award Best Novel prize but lost out to Mr. White's Confession by Robert Clark.

Goddard's book Long Time Coming won the 2011 Edgar Award for Best Original Paperback and was nominated for the 2011 Anthony award in the same category.

In 2019, Goddard was awarded the Cartier Diamond Dagger by the Crime Writers' Association for his outstanding lifetime's contribution to the crime fiction genre.

Harry Barnett
The books Into the Blue,  Out of the Sun and Never Go Back, although distinct books in their own right, form a chronological series featuring the central character of Harry Barnett. Harry Barnett also appears in both of Goddard's two published short stories, one of which Toupee for a Bald Tyre, which is set in 1970 before the events of the books.

Into the Blue was adapted for television in 1997 and starred John Thaw in the lead role of Harry Barnett. Robert Goddard was not impressed with the adaptation. In an interview, he said "The TV version of Into the Blue was a travesty of the story I wrote and I am determined that any future adaptations should be more faithful to the original."

Personal life
Robert Goddard is married and lives with his wife Vaunda in Truro, Cornwall. Several of the recent books published in his name have identified Vaunda as joint holder of the copyright.

Bibliography

Novels
Past Caring (August 1986), 
In Pale Battalions (May 1988), 
Painting the Darkness (June 1989), 
Into the Blue (May 1990), . (Harry Barnett, Book 1) (adapted as a TV film in 1996 starring John Thaw)
Take No Farewell (June 1991),  (Published in North America as Debt of Dishonour)
Hand in Glove (November 1992), 
Closed Circle (November 1993), 
Borrowed Time (April 1995), 
Out of the Sun (June 1996), . (Harry Barnett, Book 2)
Beyond Recall (June 1997), 
Caught in the Light (June 1998), 
Set in Stone (November 1999), 
Sea Change (November 2000), 
Dying to Tell (November 2001), 
Days Without Number (May 2003), 
Play to the End (May 2004), 
Sight Unseen (May 2005), 
Never Go Back (April 2006), . (Harry Barnett, Book 3)
Name to a Face (September 2007), 
Found Wanting (September 2008), 
Long Time Coming (UK: January 2010, US: March 2010), 
Blood Count (UK: March 2011), 
Fault Line (UK: March 2012), 
The Ways of the World (2013), . (James 'Max' Maxted trilogy: Book 1)
The Corners of the Globe (2014), . (James 'Max' Maxted trilogy: Book 2)
The Ends of the Earth (2015), . James 'Max' Maxted trilogy: Book 3)
Panic Room (2018), 
One False Move (2019), 
The Fine Art of Invisible Detection (2021), 
This is the Night They Come For You (2022),

Short stories
Toupee for a Bald Tyre. (Harry Barnett). Included in The Detection Collection  (Orion, 2005)
’’Intersection: Paris, 1919’’, 2013. Prologue to ‘The Ways of the World’’. Made available for free.
Birthday Buoy (Harry Barnett). Included in First Edition: Celebrating 21 Years of Goldsboro Books (Dome Press, 2020)

References

External links
Official Facebook page
Official website (archived 2015)
2009 Robert Goddard interview
2001 Robert Goddard interview (archived)
The Mystery of Robert Goddard (2001) essay
2012 Robert Goddard interview on Richard & Judy

1954 births
Living people
20th-century English novelists
21st-century English novelists
Members of the Detection Club
People from Fareham
Alumni of Peterhouse, Cambridge
English male novelists
20th-century English male writers
21st-century English male writers
Cartier Diamond Dagger winners